Lauda Air Flight 004 was a regularly scheduled international passenger flight from Bangkok, Thailand, to Vienna, Austria. On May 26, 1991, the Boeing 767-300ER operating the service crashed, following an uncommanded midair deployment of the thrust reverser on the No.1 engine, causing the aircraft to enter an aerodynamic stall, uncontrolled dive, and break up midair, killing all 213 passengers and ten crew members on board. It is the deadliest aviation incident involving the Boeing 767, and the deadliest aviation incident in Thailand's history as of 2023. The crash marked the aircraft type's first fatal incident and third hull loss. Formula One world motor racing champion Niki Lauda, who founded and ran Lauda Air, was personally involved in the accident investigation.

Aircraft
The aircraft involved was a Boeing 767-300ER that was powered by Pratt & Whitney PW4060 engines and delivered new to Lauda Air on 16 October 1989. The aircraft was registered OE-LAV, was named Mozart  and was the 283rd Boeing 767 built. At the time of the incident, the No.2 engine had been on the airframe since assembly of the aircraft (7,444 hours and 1,133 cycles) whereas the No.1 engine (with the faulty thrust reverser) had been on the aircraft since October 3, 1990 and had accumulated 2,904 hours and 456 cycles.

Accident
At the time of the accident, Lauda Air operated three weekly flights between Bangkok and Vienna. At 23:02 ICT, on 26 May 1991, Flight 4 (originating from Hong Kong's Kai Tak Airport), the Boeing 767-3Z9ER took off from Don Mueang International Airport for its passenger service to Vienna International Airport with 213 passengers and ten crew, under the command of American Captain Thomas J. Welch (48) and Austrian First Officer Josef Thurner (41). Both pilots were regarded as very competent. At 23:08, Welch and Thurner received a visual warning indication on the EICAS display telling them that a possible system failure would cause the thrust reverser on the number one engine to deploy in flight. Having already consulted the aircraft's quick reference handbook, they determined that it was "coming on and off", and that it was "just an advisory thing" and took no action, possibly believing that the indication was false, and because the 767 could stop with only one operational reverser.

At 23:17, the number one engine reverser deployed while the plane was over mountainous jungle terrain in the border area between Suphan Buri and Uthai Thani Provinces in Thailand. Thurner's last recorded words were, "Oh, reverser's deployed". Just after, the cockpit voice recorder (CVR) recorded a shuddering sound, followed closely by a snap. Because of the reverser design, the lift on the aircraft's left wing leading edge became disrupted due to the aerodynamic plume formed during the engine's rundown to idle thrust, and resulted in a 25 percent loss of lift, resulting in an aerodynamic stall. 

The aircraft immediately began a diving left turn. The CVR recorded a second snapping sound, followed by various alerts such as overspeed and master caution, and Welch's last recorded words, which were, "Jesus Christ," in response to the rapid rolling sensation, followed by "here, wait a minute", as he shut down the engine, and then, "damn it". Following this, the CVR recorded an increase in background noise, followed by several loud bangs. Maneuvering overloads produced by the pilots' attempts to regain pitch control, in combination with the velocity during the dive, already had exceeded the aircraft's structural limits, and destroyed the weakened rear fuselage, taking the rest of the damaged flight surfaces with it. The loss of the tail caused further negative loading of the wings as the airplane nosed over vertically, reaching a recorded speed of Mach 0.99 (The highest value onboard sensors were capable of recording), breaking the sound barrier. 

At that point, the wings failed and sheared off at the trailing edges, engulfing the remains of the falling aircraft in flames before impacting mountainous wooded terrain and exploding. Rescuers found Welch's body still in the pilot's seat.

Recovery
Volunteer rescue teams and local villagers looted the wreckage, taking electronics and jewellery, so relatives were unable to recover personal possessions. The bodies were taken to a hospital in Bangkok. The storage was not refrigerated and the bodies decomposed. Dental and forensic experts worked to identify bodies, but twenty-seven were never identified.

Speculation circulated that a bomb may have destroyed the aircraft, largely due to eyewitness reports of the large fireball surrounding the aircraft that had resulted from the disintegration of its right wing during the dive. The Philadelphia Inquirer, citing wire services it did not identify, stated that "the search for a motive is difficult because politically neutral Austria has generally stayed out of most international conflicts — such as the Persian Gulf War — that have made other countries' airlines the targets of terrorist attacks."

Investigation 

The flight data recorder was completely destroyed, so only the cockpit voice recorder was of use. Pradit Hoprasatsuk, the head of the Air Safety Division of the Thailand Department of Aviation, stated, "the attempt to determine why the reverser came on was hampered by the loss of the flight data recorder, which was destroyed in the crash". Upon hearing of the crash, Niki Lauda traveled to Thailand. In Thailand, Lauda attended a funeral for 23 unidentified passengers, and then traveled to Seattle to meet with Boeing representatives.

The official investigation, led by Thailand's Aircraft Accident investigation Committee, took about eight months, and was released with the "probable cause" stating: "The Accident Investigation Committee of the Government of Thailand determines the probable cause of this accident to be [an] uncommanded in-flight deployment of the left engine thrust reverser, which resulted in loss of flight path control. The specific cause of the thrust reverser deployment has not been positively identified." Different possibilities were investigated, including a short circuit in the system. Due in part to the destruction of much of the wiring, no definitive reason for the activation of the thrust reverser could be found.

As evidence started to point towards the thrust reversers as the cause of the accident, Lauda made simulator flights at Gatwick Airport which appeared to show that deployment of a thrust reverser was a survivable incident. Lauda said that the thrust reverser could not be the sole cause of the crash.    However the accident report states that the "flight crew training simulators yielded erroneous results" and stated that recovery from the loss of lift from the reverser deployment "was uncontrollable for an unexpecting flight crew".

The incident led Boeing to modify the thrust reverser system to prevent similar occurrences by adding sync-locks, which prevent the thrust reversers from deploying when the main landing gear truck tilt angle is not at the ground position. Aviation writer Macarthur Job has said that "had that Boeing 767 been of an earlier version of the type, fitted with engines that were controlled mechanically rather than electronically, then that accident could not have happened".

Lauda's visit with Boeing 
Lauda stated, "What really annoyed me was Boeing's reaction once the cause was clear. Boeing did not want to say anything." Lauda asked Boeing to fly the scenario in a simulator that used different data as compared to the one that Lauda had performed tests on at Gatwick Airport. Boeing initially refused, but Lauda insisted, so Boeing granted permission. Lauda attempted the flight in the simulator 15 times, and in every instance he was unable to recover. He asked Boeing to issue a statement, but the legal department said it could not be issued because it would take three months to adjust the wording. Lauda asked for a press conference the following day, and told Boeing that if it was possible to recover, he would be willing to fly on a 767 with two pilots and have the thrust reverser deploy in air. Boeing told Lauda that it was not possible, so he asked Boeing to issue a statement saying that it would not be survivable, and Boeing issued it. Lauda then added, "this was the first time in eight months that it had been made clear that the manufacturer [Boeing] was at fault and not the operator of the aeroplane [or Pratt and Whitney]."

Previous testing of thrust reversers 
When the US Federal Aviation Administration (FAA) asked Boeing to test activating the thrust reverser in flight, the FAA had allowed Boeing to devise the tests. Boeing had insisted that a deployment was not possible in flight. The control of the aircraft was not jeopardized. The FAA accepted the results of the test.

The Lauda aircraft was traveling at a high speed and at almost  when the left thrust reverser deployed, causing the pilots to lose control of the aircraft. James R. Chiles, author of Inviting Disaster, said, "the point here is not that a thorough test would have told the pilots Thomas J. Welch and Josef Thumer  what to do. A thrust reverser deploying in flight might not have been survivable, anyway. But a thorough test would have informed the FAA and Boeing that thrust reversers deploying in midair was such a dangerous occurrence that Boeing needed to install a positive lock that would prevent such an event." As a result of their findings during the investigation of Lauda Flight 004, additional safety features such as mechanical positive locks were mandated to prevent thrust reverser deployment in flight.

Passengers and crew

The passengers and crew included 83 Austrians: 74 passengers and nine crew members. Other nationalities included 52 Hong Kong residents, 39 Thai, 10 Italians, seven Swiss, six Chinese, four Germans, three Portuguese, three Taiwanese, three Yugoslavs, two Hungarians, two Filipinos, two Britons, three Americans (two passengers and the captain), one Australian, one Brazilian, one Pole, and one Iranian Turk girl who boarded the aircraft with a Turkish passport.

Josef Thurner, the copilot, once flew as a co-pilot with Niki Lauda on a Lauda Boeing 767 service to Bangkok, a flight that was the subject of a Reader's Digest article in January 1990 that depicted the airline positively. Macarthur Job stated that Thurner was the better known of the crew members. Thomas J. Welch, the captain, lived in Vienna, but originated from Seattle, Washington.

Notable victims include:
 Clemens August Andreae, an Austrian economics professor, was leading a group of students from the University of Innsbruck on a tour of the Far East.
 Pairat Decharin, the Governor of Chiang Mai province, and his wife. Charles S. Ahlgren, the former U.S. consul general to Chiang Mai, said "That accident not only took their lives and that of many of Chiang Mai's leaders, but dealt a blow to many development and planning activities in the town."

Aftermath
About a quarter of the airline's carrying capacity was destroyed as a result of the crash. Following the crash of OE-LAV, the airline had no flights to Sydney, on 1, 6, and 7 June. Flights resumed with another 767 on 13 June. Niki Lauda said that the crash in 1991 and the period after was the worst time in his life, even worse than the recovery from his injuries after his crash in the 1976 German Grand Prix.  After the crash, bookings from Hong Kong decreased by 20% but additional passengers from Vienna began booking flights, so there were no significant changes in overall bookings.

In early August 1991, Boeing issued an alert to airlines stating that over 1,600 late model 737s, 747s, 757s, and 767s had thrust reverser systems similar to that of OE-LAV. Two months later, customers were asked to replace potentially faulty valves in the thrust reverser systems that could cause reversers to deploy in flight.

At the crash site, which is accessible to national park visitors, a shrine was later erected to commemorate the victims.

In popular culture
The crash of Flight 004 was featured in the Canadian documentary television series Mayday, in season fourteen, episode two, titled "Testing the Limits".

See also

 Sudan Airways Flight 2241
 TAM Transportes Aéreos Regionais Flight 402
 Pacific Western Airlines Flight 314
 Atlantic Southeast Airlines Flight 2311

Notes

References
 Accident Report — Lauda Air Flight 004 (Archive) — Aircraft Accident Investigation Committee, Ministry of Transport and Communications Thailand, Prepared for World Wide Web usage by Hiroshi Sogame (十亀 洋 Sogame Hiroshi), a member of the Safety Promotion Committee (総合安全推進 Sōgō Anzen Suishin) of All Nippon Airways
 Aircraft, Volume 71. Royal Aeronautical Society Australian Division, 1991.
 Chiles, James R. Inviting Disaster. HarperCollins, 8 July 2008. , 9780061734588.
 Job, Macarthur. Air Disaster, Volume 2. Aerospace Publications, 1996. , 9781875671199.
 Parschalk, Norbert and Bernhard Thaler. Südtirol Chronik: das 20. Jahrhundert. Athesia, 1999.

Further reading
 Gilbert, Andy. "Lauda Air". South China Morning Post. Thursday 26 May 1994.
 Aviation Week & Space Technology. 1991-10-03 (32), 1991-10-06 (28–30)

External links
Lauda Air Crash 1991: still too many open questions —  Austrian Wings —  Austrias Aviation Magazine
"การสอบสวนอากาศยานประสบอุบัติเหต" Department of Civil Aviation  (Archive)
"Lauda Air B767 accident report" Ministry of Transport & Communications Thailand (in English) 
"Computer-Related Incidents with Commercial Aircraft The Lauda Air B767 Accident". (Archive) Bielefeld University. 26 May 1991.
Lauda Air Flight 004 (Index of articles) —  South China Morning Post
"flugzeugabsturz_20jahre.pdf" (Archive) University of Innsbruck. — Includes list of University of Innsbruck professors, assistants, and students who died on Flight 004
Last flight of the Mozart (Der Todesflug der Mozart, German) —  Austrian Wings —  Austria's Aviation Magazine
PlaneCrashInfo.com —  Lauda Air Flight 004
Cockpit Voice Recorder transcript and accident summary
Grand Prix History —  Biography on Niki Lauda (Contains information about Flight 004)

Airliner accidents and incidents caused by mechanical failure
Aviation accidents and incidents in 1991
Aviation accidents and incidents in Thailand
Accidents and incidents involving the Boeing 767
1991 in Thailand
Lauda Air accidents and incidents
Austria–Thailand relations
May 1991 events in Thailand
Niki Lauda
Airliner accidents and incidents caused by design or manufacturing errors